Events during the year 2011 in Poland.

Incumbents

Elections 
Bold indicates government parties.

Events

January 
 1 January – 5 places: Wolbórz, Nowe Brzesko, Pruchnik, Czyżew and Gościno received city rights.
 9 January – The nineteenth finale of the Great Orchestra of Christmas Charity.
 10 January – A test HD version of TVP1 is launched, named TVP1 HD.
 31 January – President of Poland Bronislaw Komorowski signed a law introducing a 35 percent quota for electoral lists.

February 
 7 February – Warsaw summit of the Weimar Triangle.
 19 February – Performance by the famous DJ Armin van Buuren in Poznań.
 25 February – Abolition of the Property Commission of the Catholic Church.

March 
 1 March – The first time Poland celebrated a new national holiday: National Day of Remembrance "Soldiers accursed".
 25 March – The Polish Sejm adopted a government proposal declining pension contributions transferred to open pension funds.

April 
 1 April – Start of the Polish Census 2011.
 29 April – The court annulled the Walbrzych presidential election.

May 
 17 May – Sejm investigative committee for Christopher Olewnik adopted a report on its work.

June 
 5 June – Rebranding of phone company Era to T-Mobile Poland.
 28 June – Lukasz Kaminski sworn in as president of the Institute of National Remembrance.

July 
 1 July – Poland takes over the Presidency of the Council of the European Union from Hungary for a six-month term.
 29 July – Committee for Investigation of National Aviation Accidents of the Polish Civil Aviation Authority announced a report on the causes of the Smolensk catastrophe on 10 April 2010.

August 
 1 August – "The Law of 5 January 2011 - Election Code" comes into force.
 4 August – The Polish President, Bronislaw Komorowski, officially announces the Parliamentary election date, set for 5 October  2011.
 12 August – Four people have been killed and 30 people injured after a train derailed between Warsaw and Katowice in Poland.
 18 August – The Gdynia District Court acquitted Adam Darski, the leader of death metal band Behemoth, accused of insulting religious feelings.

September 
 3 September – Opening of the Polish National Stadium (Earlier called: Stadium of the Decade)
 8–9 September – Tenth Jubilee International Ignatius Reimann Festival in Krosnowice.

October 
 9 October – Polish Parliamentary Elections, 2011.

Unknown date 
A Liquefied natural gas (LNG) plant was set up in Swinoujscie.

Deaths

January 

 2 January – Cezary Kuleszyński, hurdler. (b. 1937)
 7 January:
 Krzysztof Kolberger, Polish actor. (b. 1950)
 Włodzimierz Ławniczak, Polish journalist (b. 1959)
 9 January – Jerzy Woźniak, Polish soccer player, Polish representative (b. 1932)
 14 January – Zdzisław Szczotkowski, Polish lector (b. 1945)
 23 January – Tomasz Wełnicki, Polish journalist, politician (b. 1957)
 24 January – Włodzimierz Kłopocki, Polish actor (b. 1934)
 25 January – Andrzej Szypulski, Polish screenwriter and novelist (b. 1936)
 27 January – Jan Baszkiewicz, Polish lawyer, historian, political scientist (b. 1930)

February 

 1 February – Stanisław Michalski, Polish actor (b. 1932)
 4 February – Janusz Pezda, Polish politician and governor of Jelenia Góra (b. 1943)
 6 February:
 Jerzy Banaśkiewicz – Polish Catholic cleric, poet (b. 1937)
 Magdalena Tesławska – Polish film and theatre costume designer (b. 1945)
 9 February:
 Andrzej Przybielski, Polish jazz trumpeter (b. 1944)
 Janusz Maciejewski, Polish philologist, literary critic (b. 1930)
 10 February:
 Józef Życiński, Polish Catholic cleric, Archbishop of Lublin (b. 1948)
 Antoni Halor, Polish film and theatre director, artist literary (b. 1937)
 15 February:
 Sławomir Radoń, Polish historian, General Director of State Archives (b. 1957)
 Karin Stanek, Polish singer, lead singer of the band Czerwono-Czarni (b. 1946)
 21 February – Jerzy Nowosielski, Polish painter, illustrator, set designer (b. 1923)

March 

 3 March – Irena Kwiatkowska, Polish actor (b. 1912)
 4 March – Lucyna Legut, Polish actor (b. 1926)
 19 March – Anna Kajtochowa, Polish writer, novelist, journalist (b. 1928)
 23 March – Antoni Jurasz, Polish actor (b. 1922)
 26 March:
 Roman Piętka, Polish priest, Archimandrite (b. 1937)
 Paul Baran, American computer scientist of Polish descent (b. 1926)

April 

 3 April:
 Marian Pankowski, Polish writer (b. 1919)
 Andrzej Butruk, Polish actor, lector, satirist (b. 1964)
 16 April:
 Henryk Zomerski, Polish bass guitarist (b. 1942)
 Tadeusz Pawlusiak, Polish ski jumper (b. 1946)
 18 April – Andrzej Piszczatowski, Polish actor (b. 1945)
 20 April – Halina Skibniewska, Polish architect, politician, Deputy Speaker of the Sejm (b. 1921)
 25 April – Ryszard Nawrocki, Polish actor (b. 1940)
 27 April – Zdzisław Rutecki, Polish speedway, speedway sports coach (b. 1960)
 29 April – Waldemar Baszanowski, Polish weightlifter, World and European champion, Olympic champion (b. 1935)

May 

 12 May – Piotr Żyżelewicz, Polish drummer, member of the teams: Armia, Izrael, Voo Voo and 2Tm2, 3 (b. 1965)
 15 May – Krystyna Dmochowska, Polish actor (b. 1956)
 17 May – Ewa Szumańska, Polish writer, reporter, satirist (b. 1921)
 18 May – Włada Majewska, Polish radio journalist, actress, singer (b. 1911)
 25 May:
 Edward Żentara, Polish actor (b. 1956)
 Marek Nawara, Polish politician (b. 1956)
 27 May:
 Małgorzata Dydek, Polish basketball player (b. 1974)
 Jacek Puchała, Polish surgeon (b. 1956)
 29 May – Krystyna Skuszanka, Polish theatre director and principal of theatres (b. 1924)

June 

 4 June – Jerzy Świątkiewicz, Polish lawyer (b. 1925)
 6 June – Stefan Kuryłowicz, Polish architect (b. 1949)
 13 June – Onil, Polish rapper (b. 1980)
 18 June – Marek Szufa, Polish pilot, vice-champion in gliding Aerobatic Flying (b. 1954)
 25 June – Jan Kułakowski, Polish politician and trade-unionist (b. 1930)
 27 June – Maciej Zembaty, Polish poet, translator, musician, satirist (b. 1944)
 30 June – Tadeusz Skutnik, Polish journalist and poet (b. 1947)

July 

 12 July – Roman Stanisław Ingarden, mathematical physicist (b. 1920)
 16 July:
 Albin Małysiak, Polish cleric, Roman Catholic Bishop of Kraków (b. 1917)
 Kazimierz Neumann, Polish rower (b. 1933)
 20 July – Rafał Balcewicz, Polish ice hockey player (b. 1987)
 21 July:
 Andrzej Zalewski, Polish radio journalist (b. 1924)
 Kazimierz Świątek, Polish Catholic spiritual, Roman Catholic Cardinal (b. 1914)
 23 July –  Janusz Gniatkowski, Polish singer (b. 1928)

August 

 5 August – Andrzej Lepper, Polish unionist, politician, Deputy Prime Minister, Minister of Agriculture (b. 1954)
 6 August – Roman Opałka, Polish painter and graphic artist (b. 1931)
 13 August – Jerzy Masztaler, Polish football coach (b. 1946)
 19 August – Janusz Kierzkowski, Polish track cyclist (b. 1947)
 21 August – Maria Kornatowska, Polish film critic, essayist, lecturer at the Łódź Film School (b. 1943)
 22 August – Andrzej Urbanowicz, Polish painter and visual artist (b. 1938)

September 
 3 September – Andrzej Maria Deskur, Polish Catholic cleric, Cardinal (b. 1924)
 6 September:
 Janusz Morgenstern, Polish film director (b. 1922)
 Damian Szojda, Polish Franciscan, an interpreter the Bible (b. 1932)
 15 September – Regina Smendzianka, Polish pianist and pedagogue (b. 1924)
 16 September – Maria Sawicka, Polish social activist, lawyer (b. 1923)
 17 September:
 Magda Teresa Wójcik, Polish actress, film director (b. 1934)
 Tomasz Zygadło, Polish film director, screenwriter (b. 1947)

See also 
 2011 in Polish television

References 

 
Poland
pl:2011#Wydarzenia w Polsce